The 1898 World Allround Speed Skating Championships took place at 6 and 7 February 1898 at the ice rink Eisstadion in Davos, Switzerland.

Jack McCulloch was the defending champion but did not participate.

The Norwegian Peder Østlund won three distances but did not finish the 500 meter. According to the rules he became World champion. The German Julius Seyler who finished all the distances had the best score.

Allround results 

  * = Fell
 NC = Not classified
 NF = Not finished
 NS = Not started
 DQ = Disqualified
Source: SpeedSkatingStats.com

Rules 
Four distances have to be skated:
 500m
 1500m
 5000m
 10000m

One could only win the World Championships by winning at least three of the four distances, so there would be no World Champion if no skater won at least three distances.

Silver and bronze medals were not awarded.

References 

World Allround Speed Skating Championships, 1898
1898 World Allround
World Allround, 1898
Sport in Davos
1898 in Swiss sport
February 1898 sports events